The Kantarō Suzuki Cabinet is the 42nd Cabinet of Japan led by Kantarō Suzuki from April 7 to August 17, 1945.

Cabinet

References 

Cabinet of Japan
1945 establishments in Japan
Cabinets established in 1945
Cabinets disestablished in 1945